The Thurston House is a historic house at 923 Cumberland Street in Little Rock, Arkansas.  It is a -story wood-frame structure, with a blend of Colonial Revival and Queen Anne styles.  It has a hip roof with gabled dormer and cross gabled sections, and its porch is supported by Tuscan columns, with dentil molding at the cornice, and a spindled balustrade.  It was designed by noted Arkansas architect Charles L. Thompson and built about 1900.

The house was listed on the National Register of Historic Places in 1982.

See also
National Register of Historic Places listings in Little Rock, Arkansas

References

Houses on the National Register of Historic Places in Arkansas
Queen Anne architecture in Arkansas
Colonial Revival architecture in Arkansas
Houses completed in 1900
Houses in Little Rock, Arkansas
National Register of Historic Places in Little Rock, Arkansas
1900 establishments in Arkansas